The giant sunbird (Dreptes thomensis) is a species of bird in the family Nectariniidae. It is the only species in the genus Dreptes. It is endemic to the island of São Tomé (São Tomé and Príncipe), where it occurs in the central massif.

Its natural habitats are subtropical or tropical moist lowland forest and subtropical or tropical moist montane forest. It is threatened by habitat loss. The species was first described by José Vicente Barbosa du Bocage in 1889.

References

External links
BirdLife Species Factsheet.

Nectariniidae
Endemic birds of São Tomé and Príncipe
Birds described in 1889
Fauna of São Tomé Island
Taxonomy articles created by Polbot